Catherine Rachel "Katie" Prankerd (née Curtis; born 1 November 1988) is a Welsh former professional road and track cyclist.

Career
Born in Cardiff, Prankerd began competing at a young age with the Maindy Flyers children's cycle club before joining Cardiff Ajax. Prankerd set the record for the  Tandem Standing Start event on the track along with Alex Greenfield, with a time of 7 minutes 4.424 seconds. The record was set at the Newport Velodrome on 10 June 2004. They also held the  Tandem Standing Start event on the track, with a time of 13 minutes 10.421 seconds. The record was also set at the Newport Velodrome, on 16 May 2006. In 2008 Prankerd rode with Team Halfords Bikehut before moving to Vision1 Racing in 2009.

Prankerd suffered a setback to her cycling career when she was diagnosed with Crohn's disease. Subsequently, she took up a coaching role at the Wales National Velodrome in Newport and teamed up with partially sighted cyclist Nia Knight with a view to competing in the tandem event at the 2014 Commonwealth Games. Prankerd subsequently rode solo, representing Wales in the scratch race, where she finished 7th.

Major results

Track

2003
 3rd Scratch, National Youth Championships
2004
 National Youth Championships
1st  Points race
1st  Scratch
2nd Sprint
 3rd Scratch, National Junior Championships
 Commonwealth Youth Games
4th 500m time trial
7th Points race
2005
 National Junior Championships
1st  Scratch
2nd Points race
3rd Sprint
 3rd Keirin, National Championships
2006
 National Junior Championships
1st  Points race
2nd Scratch
 National Championships
2nd Scratch
3rd Points race
2007
 1st WCRA 'Derny Paced' Championships
 National Championships
2nd Points race
3rd Derny
3rd Scratch
 8th Scratch, UCI Track World Championships
2013
 Newport International Cup
3rd Female B 3km Individual pursuit (with Nia Knight)
7th Female B 1km Time trial (with Nia Knight)
 9th Tandem B road race, UCI Paracycling World Cup Round 5, Matane (with Nia Knight)
2014
 7th Scratch, Commonwealth Games
2015
 Revolution Round 6, Manchester
2nd Points race
2nd Scratch
2017
 3rd Team pursuit, National Championships

Road

2003
 2nd Criterium, National Junior Road Championships
2004
 1st  Criterium, National Junior Road Championships
2007
 1st Road race, Welsh Road Championships
 3rd Criterium, National Road Championships
2013
 2nd Tandem, National Paracycling Road Circuit Championships (with Nia Knight)
2014
 1st Newport Nocturne
 5th Milk Race
 8th Cheshire Classic
2015
 3rd Women's Tour de Yorkshire
 3rd Milk Race
 5th Cheshire Classic
 9th London Nocturne

References

External links
Profile on British Cycling website

1988 births
Living people
Welsh track cyclists
Welsh female cyclists
Sportspeople from Cardiff
Cyclists at the 2014 Commonwealth Games
Commonwealth Games competitors for Wales